The North of England Inward Investment Agency (NoE, North of England, North England) is a UK government sponsored agency that represents two regional development agencies (RDAs) in North England: Northwest Regional Development Agency (NWDA), One NorthEast (ONE) and Yorkshire Forward (YF). NoE’s primary function is to work as an ambassador to businesses and therefore attract targeted inward investment to the North of England region.

NoE provides a link between businesses considering European expansion or relocation and resources in North England. Once a company makes the decision to expand or relocate into North England, NoE’s function changes to be a bridge for that transition, working to connect new inward investment companies with the people, resources, funding and more to help minimize risk and increase profitability. Some of the planning services that NoE provides to potential inward investment companies include: industry trends analysis, recruitment and training assistance, matching skills provision to employer needs, site location assistance, legal/customs/taxation information, introductions to private funding, links to academia, as well as UK and region specific economic and market information.

With several offices located throughout the U.S. and Canada NoE targets specific industries that would benefit from the infrastructure in place in the UK.  These specific industries include:  Life Sciences , Energy and Environment , IT and Media , Advanced Engineering , and Professional Services .

NoE was established under the Regional Development Agencies Act 1998, all of which were formally launched in eight English regions on 1 April 1999. It is funded from six Government departments:
Department for Business, Enterprise and Regulatory Reform;
Department for Communities and Local Government;
Department for Culture, Media and Sport;
Department for Environment, Food and Rural Affairs;
Department for Innovation, Universities and Skills;
UK Trade & Investment

Each RDA is led by a Chair and a Board of 15 people. The RDA Chairs meet regularly with each other and with Government ministers to advise on national policy. They provide a regional perspective informed by work on the ground with partners and by the extensive consultations they hold in the regions. RDAs help central government ensure that local conditions and local needs are fully taken into account when they draw up national policy.

The Region

The North England region encompasses the cities of Leeds, Liverpool, Manchester, Newcastle, Sheffield and Sunderland. The North is considered by many to be one of the most culturally dynamic regions in the UK, with an identity separate from that of the rest of England. The underlying structural changes occurring in the North England economy has been impressive. Manchester, Leeds, Newcastle, Sheffield and Liverpool have all outpaced UK national economic growth. The Northwest has a projected £111 billion economy (the 12th largest in Europe),while the Northeast's economy has an annual turnover of £4bn. Healthcare, life sciences, advanced engineering, business and financial services, multimedia and energy are all significant contributors to North England's economic infrastructure. Some of the Region's Top Industries include: Life Sciences , Energy and Environment , IT and Media , Advanced Engineering , and Professional Services .

Board Members in the Region

Simon Goon - Chairman

Patrick Kendall- ONE Northeast

Sarah Kemp- NWDA

John Cunliffe- NWDA

Kristen Hirst- NOE

Universities in the Region

University of Bradford

University of Huddersfield

University of Hull

The University of Law

University of Leeds

Leeds Beckett University

Leeds Trinity University

University of Sheffield

Sheffield Hallam University

University of York

York St John University

Newcastle University

Northumbria University

Durham University

Lancaster University

Liverpool John Moores University

University of Liverpool

University of Salford

University of Bolton

University of Cumbria

University of Sunderland

University of Manchester

Inward Investment and North England

Inward investment is the injection of money from an external source into a region, in order to purchase capital goods for a branch of a corporation to locate or develop its presence in the region. Foreign firms are a catalyst for better economic performance. For one thing, they invest more, employ more skilled people and are more productive. Careful consideration should be given to the costs and benefits of attracting inward investors. When locating a business, inward investors seek:

A stable macro-economic climate
stable political and regulatory environment
Market access and open competition
A welcoming environment
Available sites and/or premises
Appropriate, available and reliable utilities and transportation
Available skilled workforce
Available local suppliers and resources
Appropriate education, training and research facilities
A good quality of life
Manageable regulation and taxation systems
Incentive schemes

Foreign firms continue to see the UK as an attractive place for business expansion or business relocation; it is the number one gateway to Europe giving easy access to the 27 member states of the European Union, the world's largest single market, with its population of nearly 500 million. The UK government recently reported that the United States remains the primary source for inward investment in the United Kingdom, accounting for 50 percent of all projects, followed by Germany, Canada, Japan, and France. According to UK Trade and Investment, (UKTI), more than 1,200 overseas companies chose to invest in the UK in 2007, making it the best year ever for inward investment. More than 45,000 new jobs were created last year by companies launching in the UK or expanding existing operations while 58,000 jobs were safeguarded, with US firms accounting for 30% of all new investments during the year.

In North England, energy and world-leading R&D, 4.7 million skilled employees, of which 1.7 million work in science and technology, and quality of life, including low cost of living, has made this region a logical choice for companies seeking to expand or relocate their operations overseas. Inward investment and technical progress in the United Kingdom manufacturing sector

Companies in the Region

AstraZeneca

Google

General Electric

General Motors/Vauxhall

Caterpillar Inc.

Centers of Excellence

The Centre of Excellence in Biocatalysis, Biotransformations (Bioprocessing) and Biomanufacture (CoEBio3) 

Daresbury Science and Innovation Campus

Joule Centre for Energy Research 

New and Renewable Energy Centre (NaREC)

[North East Stem Cell Institute](NESCI)  

UK BioBank

UK Centre for Tissue Regeneration 

North West Embryonic Stem Cell Centre (NWESCC)

Projects

MediaCityUK

Offices in North America

NoE had several offices in the United States, including Atlanta, Boston, Chicago, Newport Beach, and Toronto. Kristen Hirst, Senior Vice President, oversees the agency's operations throughout North America.

Atlanta (South East Region)

3455 Peachtree Road, 5th Floor
Atlanta, GA  30326

Boston (New England Region)

8 Franeuil Hall Market Place, 3rd Floor
Boston, MA 02109 (Prior to 2001 The NOE was based in the offices of Yorkshire Forward at 28 Junction Square Dr, Concord, MA 01742, USA)

Chicago (North East & Midwest Region)

444 North Michigan Avenue, Suite 3350
Chicago, IL  60611

Newport Beach (West Coast Region)

4695 MacArthur Court, 11th Floor
Newport Beach, CA  92660

Toronto (Canada)

234 Berkeley Street
Toronto, ON M5A 2X4

References

Inward investment
North East England
North West England
Economy of England
Foreign relations of England
Investment in the United Kingdom
Northern England